is a Japanese actress and singer.

Filmography

Television
 Onna Taikoki (NHK, 1981) as Asahi no kata
 Oshin as Fuji (NHK, 1983)
 Sanga Moyu (NHK, 1984)
 Inochi (NHK, 1986)
 Wataru Seken wa Oni Bakari as Kojima Satsuki (TBS, 1990–present)
 Onna wa Dokyo (NHK, 1992)
 Hito no Fuko wa Mitsu no Aji (TBS, 1994)
 Kamisan no Waruguchi (TBS, 1995)
 Papa Survival (TBS, 1995)
 Tatakau Oyome-sama (NTV, 1995)
 Dareka ga Dareka ni Koishiteru (TBS, 1996)
 Bancha mo Debana (TBS, 1997)
 Subarashiki Kazoku Ryokou (TBS, 1998)
 Haru no Wakusei (TBS, 1999)
 Romance (NTV, 1999)
 Onna to Ai to Mystery (TV Tokyo, 2001–present)
 Akarui Hou e Akarui Hou e as Takahashi Utako (TBS, 2001)
 Blackjack ni Yoroshiku as Kaneko Akiko (TBS, 2003, episodes 1–2)
 Hatsu Tsubomi (TBS, 2003)
 Chotto Matte Kami-sama (NHK, 2004)
 Akai Tsuki as Hara Yoko (TV Tokyo, 2004)
 Misora Hibari Tanjo Monogatari as Kato Kimie (TBS, 2005)
 Haru to Natsu as Nakahara Misa (NHK, 2005)
 Yato (TBS, 2005)
 Onna no Ichidaiki: Setouchi Jakucho as Omata Kin (Fuji TV, 2005)
 Satomi Hakkenden as Kamezasa (Fuji TV, 2006)
 Waraeru Koi wa Shitakunai as Ooyama Kazuyo (TBS, 2006)
 Shinjuku no Haha Monogatari as Kurihara Sumiko (Fuji TV, 2006)
 Saga no Gabai-baachan (Fuji TV, 2007)
 Ai no Rukeichi (NTV, 2007)
 Kazoku e no Love Letter (Fuji TV, 2007)
 Joshi Deka! as Sakura Hanako (TBS, 2007)
 Asakusa Fukumaru Ryokan as Himeda Natsuko (TBS, 2007, episode 10)
 Egao wo Kureta Kimi e (Fuji TV, 2008)
 Kurobe no Taiyo as Kuramatsu Tsuru (Fuji TV, 2009)
 Tonari no Shibafu as Takahira Shino (TBS, 2009)
 Chichi yo, Anata wa Erakatta (TBS, 2009)
 Doctor-X: Surgeon Michiko Daimon Season 4 (TV Asahi, 2016) as Dr. Toko Kubo
 Segodon (NHK, 2018) as Honju-in

Films
 Oshin (2013)

Honours 
Order of the Rising Sun, 4th Class, Gold Rays with Rosette (2019)

References

External links 
 JDorama.com

1947 births
Living people
Japanese television actresses
Asadora lead actors
Japanese women singers
Singers from Tokyo
Recipients of the Order of the Rising Sun, 4th class